Xu Da (1332–1385), courtesy name Tiande, was a Chinese military general and politician who lived in the late Yuan dynasty and early Ming dynasty. He was a friend of the Hongwu Emperor, the founder and first ruler of the Ming dynasty, and assisted him in overthrowing the Mongol-led Yuan dynasty and establishing the Ming dynasty. He was also the father of Empress Xu, who married the third Ming ruler, the Yongle Emperor.

Biography
Xu Da was described as a stalwart man with slim face and high cheekbones, he joined the Red Turban rebels in 1353 to overthrow the Mongol-led Yuan dynasty in China. Xu served as a general under Zhu Yuanzhang, a prominent rebel leader, and assisted him in defeating other rival warlords and opposing forces. In 1368, the year when the Ming dynasty was founded, Xu Da and other Ming generals led an attack on Khanbaliq (present-day Beijing), the Yuan capital, and forced the last Yuan ruler, Toghon Temür, to flee northward.

Xu Da led a pursuit on the retreating Yuan forces and encountered Taejo of Joseon, the founder of the Korean Joseon dynasty, who was ordered by the Mongols to attack the Ming army. Xu Da's presence struck fear into the Korean generals, who in turn, allied themselves with the Ming forces instead. Afterwards, Xu Da's army entered Mongol territory, routed Mongol reinforcements, sacked the Mongol capital at Karakorum, and captured thousands of Mongol nobles in 1370. His army ventured to Transbaikalia and reached further north than any other Chinese army had ever before.

Xu Da died in 1385 under mysterious circumstances. He was not accused of plotting an assassination on the Hongwu Emperor – although many other generals who contributed heavily to the founding of the Ming dynasty were put to death by the emperor for allegedly plotting rebellions. According to legend, Xu Da was allergic to goose, so the Hongwu Emperor sent him a goose dish and ordered the emissary to ensure that Xu ate it and died. This statement is not a fact, but a rumor. Xu Da died of natural illness. His family was still very prominent in the Ming dynasty.

Family 
Wives and Issue:
 Lady, of the Zhang clan (張氏)
 Lady, of the Xie clan (謝氏), daughter of Xie Zaixing (謝再興)
 Xu Huizu (徐輝祖; 1368–1407), 1st son
 Xu Zengshou (徐增壽; d. 1402), 3rd son
 Xu Yihua, Empress Renxiaowen (仁孝文皇后 徐儀華; 5 March 1362 – 6 August 1407), 1st daughter
Married Zhu Di, the future Emperor Yongle, in 1736 and had issue.(4 daughters and 3 sons)
 Lady, of the Sun clan (孫氏)
 Xu Yingxu (徐膺緒; 1372 – 2 March 1416), 4th son
 Lady, of the Jia clan (賈氏)
 Unknown name/Posible to be Xu Miaojin (徐妙锦), 4th daughter 
 Unknown:
 Xu Tianfu (徐添福), 2nd son — died young
 Lady Xu (徐氏; d. 1427), 2nd daughter
Married Zhu Gui, son of Hongwu Emperor, and had issue (3 sons)
 Lady Xu (徐氏; d. 1449), 3rd daughter
Married Zhu Ying, Prince of Ai, son of Hongwu Emperor

Ancestry

In fiction

Xu Da appears as a minor character in Louis Cha's wuxia novel The Heaven Sword and Dragon Saber. As a member of the anti-Yuan Ming Cult, Xu Da participated actively in the rebellions to overthrow the Yuan dynasty under the leadership of Zhang Wuji. Zhang passes Xu the Book of Wumu, a text on military strategy written by the Song dynasty general Yue Fei. Xu benefits greatly from reading the book, becomes a brilliant military commander, and assists Zhu Yuanzhang in overthrowing the Yuan dynasty and establishing the Ming dynasty.

References

1332 births
1385 deaths
Generals from Anhui
Ming dynasty chancellors
Ming dynasty generals
People from Fengyang